Nick Jonas Live is the first concert tour for American pop singer, songwriter Nick Jonas without his band, the Administration or the Jonas Brothers, to support his second studio album, Nick Jonas (2014). The tour starts on September 22 in Seattle and ends on November 6th in New York.

Background and development 
On September 4, 2014, Jonas tweeted a message that said that he had a big announcement coming the next day. The next day he announced that he would go on tour. He also revealed the tour dates. On September 6, fans could pre- order his upcoming album to get early access to the tour ticket sale. They will also receive a download of his single "Jealous" on September 8, 2014.

Set list 
This set list is representative of the performance on October 30, 2014. It is not representative of all concerts for the duration of the tour.

"Chains"
"Take Over"/ "Catch Me" 
"Numb"
"Crazy" 
"Warning"
"A Little Bit Longer"
"Push"/ "The Worst 
"Teacher"
"Santa Barbara"
"Wilderness" / "California Love" 
"I Want You"
"Nothing Would Be Better"/ "Stay with Me" 
"Jealous"

Shows

Notes

References 

2014 concert tours
Nick Jonas concert tours